Lin Shen or Lin Yushen (born October 23, 1980) is a Chinese actor. His mother was the film producer Li Xiaowan. He first appeared in 2012 in the film Watch Sky, and received media attention. In 2019, he was an actor for the television series Heavenly Sword and Dragon Slaying Sabre.

Filmography

Television series

Awards and nominations

References

External links 
 
 

Male actors from Beijing
1980 births
Living people
21st-century Chinese male actors
Chinese male television actors
Chinese male film actors